Giovanni Cinqui or Giovanni del Cinque (Scarperia, 1667 -1743) was an Italian painter.

Biography
He trained in Florence under Pietro Dandini, He worked in the court of Cosimo III. He painted in the Villa Medicea dell'Ambrogiana, the  Palazzo di Gino Capponi in Florence, the Oratory of the Villa Medicea di Lilliano, and for the church of Santa Rosa at Viterbo.

References

1667 births
1743 deaths
17th-century Italian painters
Italian male painters
18th-century Italian painters
Painters from Florence
Italian Baroque painters
18th-century Italian male artists